Alessandro Viligiardi (born 25 July 1967) is an Italian gymnast. He competed in eight events at the 1992 Summer Olympics.

References

External links
 

1967 births
Living people
Italian male artistic gymnasts
Olympic gymnasts of Italy
Gymnasts at the 1992 Summer Olympics
Gymnasts from Rome